Hugo Aine (born 11 December 1995) is a former French professional footballer who last played as a midfielder for FC Chambly.

Club career
Aine made his professional debut in March 2015, in a 1–2 Ligue 2 defeat against Clermont Foot.

On 23 June 2016, Aine joined FC Chambly of the Championnat National.

In September 2017, during a match against Red Star, Aine suffered a heart attack. He was diagnosed with Arrythmia and forced to end his professional career.

References

External links
 
 
 
 Hugo Aine foot-national.com Profile

1995 births
Living people
Association football midfielders
French footballers
Ligue 2 players
Championnat National players
AC Ajaccio players
FC Chambly Oise players
Corsica international footballers
Footballers from Corsica